
Year 137 BC was a year of the pre-Julian Roman calendar. At the time it was known as the Year of the Consulship of Porcina and Mancinus (or, less frequently, year 617 Ab urbe condita) and the Fourth Year of Jianyuan. The denomination 137 BC for this year has been used since the early medieval period, when the Anno Domini calendar era became the prevalent method in Europe for naming years.

Events 
 By place 
 Roman Republic 
 Tiberius Gracchus, quaestor in Spain, observes that slave labor has displaced small freeheld farms.
 Numantine War begins, Quintus Pompeius and M. Papilius Laenas are defeated and disgraced by the Numantians in subsequent years.
 Q. Pompeius is brought to trial by Q.Metellus and others, but acquitted.

Births

Deaths 
 Dutugamunu King of Sri Lanka
 Zhao Tuo, Emperor Wu of Nanyue (b. 240 BC)

References